The Nicholls Colonels women's volleyball team represents Nicholls State University in Thibodaux, Louisiana, United States. The school's team currently competes in the Southland Conference, which is part of the National Collegiate Athletic Association's Division I. Nicholls State's first volleyball team was fielded in 1975. The team plays its home games at 3,800-seat Stopher Gymnasium and are coached by Kallie Noble.

See also
Nicholls Colonels
List of NCAA Division I women's volleyball programs

References

External links
 

 
Volleyball clubs established in 1975
1975 establishments in Louisiana